Frances Borzello is a British art historian and scholar, feminist art critic and author. Her work specializes in the social history of art, and includes study on the social position of European woman artists in the context of their society, the study of female self-portraits and female nudes. She authored the book Seeing Ourselves: Women's Self Portraits, which has been continuously published since 1998 and has 30 editions. Her work widely recognized as contribution to the fields of art history and women's studies.

Biography 
Borzello earned her PhD from the University College London in 1980. Her dissertation published in 1981 and was titled, "The relationship of fine art and the poor in late nineteenth century England". Borzello was a member of a women's photography group founded in the 1970s called Second Sight, which included members such as Annette Kuhn, Jill Pack, and Cassandra Wedd.

Borzello's writing "Preaching to the converted? Feminist art publishing in the 1980s," was included in the 1995 book New Feminist Art Criticism: Critical Strategies.

Her book first published in 1998, Seeing Ourselves: Women's Self Portraits discusses women creating their own images and the power of self-portrait rather than being portrayed as objects, as well as a historical look at gender, identity and representation. The book is an in-depth look at history, starting with the self-portraits of Medieval nuns and eventually ending in the 21st century, the book is acknowledging themes in the self portraits including motherhood, female beauty, musical talents as seen in early work and in the 20th century themes of sexuality, pain, race, gender and disease. Some artists in the book Seeing Ourselves: Women's Self Portraits include: Judith Leyster, Anna Dorothea Therbusch, Marie-Nicole Dumont, Hortense Haudebourt-Lescot, Suzanne Valadon, Gwen John, Paula Modersohn-Becker, Charlotte Berend-Corinth, Frida Kahlo, Wanda Wulz, Charlotte Salomon, Judy Chicago, Jo Spence, Hannah Wilke, Carolee Schneemann, Cindy Sherman, Tracey Emin and more. The 2016 edition of Seeing Ourselves: Women's Self Portraits is fully revised and includes a new afterword by the author about selfies.

The 2010 book, Frida Kahlo: Face to Face was co-authored with American artist Judy Chicago, and focused on Frida Kahlo's career as well as Kahlo's artwork in relation to topics like female self portraiture and commercialization.

Bibliography

Books 

Seeing Ourselves: Women's Self-Portraits. Thames & Hudson, 2016. 
The Naked Nude. Thames & Hudson, 2012. 
Frida Kahlo: Face to Face. co-authored with Judy Chicago, Prestel, 2010. 
At Home: The Domestic Interior in Art. Thames & Hudson, 2006. 
Reclining Nude. co-authored with Lidia Guibert Ferrara, Thames & Hudson, 2002. 
Mirror Mirror: Self-Portraits by Women Artists. by Liz Rideal and contributions by Frances Borzello and Whitney Chadwick, Watson-Guptill, 2002. 
A World of Our Own: Women as Artists Since the Renaissance . Watson-Guptill, 2000. 
Seeing Ourselves: Women's Self-Portraits. (first edition) Harry N. Abrams, 1998. 
Civilizing Caliban: The Misuse of Art, 1875-1980. Routledge Kegan & Paul, 1987. 
The New Art History. co-authored with A.L. Rees. Camden Press, May 1986. 
Women Artists: A Graphic Guide. co-authored with Natacha Ledwidge, Camden Press, 1986.

Articles 

 Auchmuty, Rosemary, Borzello, Frances, Davis Langdell, Cheri. “The Image of Women's Studies.” Women's Studies International Forum, vol. 6, no. 3, 1983, pp. 291–298, .
Borzello, Frances. “Helene Schjerfbeck: And Nobody Knows What I'm Like.” Woman's Art Journal, vol. 25, no. 1, 2004, pp. 48–50. JSTORS, .
 Borzello, Frances. “Tea, Toilets & Typewriters: Women's Clubs in London.” History Today, vol. 58, no. 12, Dec. 2008.

See also 

 Women in the art history field

References

External links 

 Article: "Nude awakening" by Borzello, from 2 November 2002, The Guardian newspaper
 Article: "Kenneth Clark - Changing the Way We See", an interview with Borzello discussing art historian Kenneth Clark, from 20 March 2005, Sunday Morning on Radio National
 Podcast: , a podcast with Borzello

Year of birth missing (living people)
Living people
Women art historians
Alumni of University College London
British women historians
British feminist writers
Feminist historians